The Sig Sauer P290 is a polymer frame subcompact handgun that was produced from 2011 to 2017 by SIG Sauer of Exeter, New Hampshire. It was replaced by the SIG Sauer P365.

Features
The P290 is chambered in 9×19mm Parabellum (9mm Luger, 9mm NATO). The slide is stainless steel treated with Nitron, making it appear black.  The slide rides on a stainless steel frame, which sits in the polymer grip section (or frame). The P290 is not a modular design and comes in one caliber and frame size only. The P290 comes with one six-round magazine, and one eight-round magazine with extended baseplate. The six-round magazine has a baseplate with a small finger rest, and also comes with a flush-fit baseplate without the finger rest.

The sights are tritium illuminated Siglight Night Sights with an optional proprietary laser sight. The sights feature two dots on the rear and one on the front. Sig Sauer handguns are combat sighted. Units come with a holster, safety loop lock, magazines , and flush baseplate. The grip module has interchangeable panels to change the appearance.  The P290 trigger is a double-action only (DAO) trigger which actuates a hammer to fire the cartridge.

P290RS
The P290 model was replaced by a new model in 2012 by the SIG Sauer P290RS.   The main difference is that the DAO trigger has been redesigned.  The shooter can now simply pull the trigger a second time if there is a misfire.  This is called "Restrike Capability."  Prior to the restrike capability redesign, a misfire required that the shooter retract the slide to reset the trigger disconnector in order to attempt to fire a cartridge that failed to ignite on the first attempt.

Some other elements were redesigned also including the grip beavertail area, added finger support on the magazine baseplate, a reshaped magazine release and slide hold-open lever.

These handguns can be found with one or two magazines, holster, accessories and sometimes extra grip panels.  Magazines are usually a 6-round capacity magazine and an 8-round magazine with an extended finger tab giving a great deal more control. The P290RS was also made chambered in .380 ACP caliber.

Notes

References

External links
 P290RS video by Sig Sauer
 P290RS .380 ACP video by Sig Sauer

9mm Parabellum semi-automatic pistols
.380 ACP semi-automatic pistols
SIG Sauer semi-automatic pistols
Semi-automatic pistols of the United States
Weapons and ammunition introduced in 2011